Claudine Georgette Longet (born 29 January 1942) is a Franco-American singer, actress, dancer, and recording artist popular during the 1960s and 1970s.

Born in Paris, France, Longet was married to American singer and television entertainer Andy Williams from 1961 until 1975. She has maintained a private profile since 1977, following her conviction for negligent homicide in connection with the shooting death of her boyfriend, former Olympic skier Spider Sabich.

Career

Her first appearances as an actress on TV were in two 1963 episodes of McHale's Navy. She acted in the 1964 theatrical feature film of the same title. Many of her acting roles during the 1960s were in episodes of TV adventure series that included Twelve O'Clock High, Combat!, The Name of the Game, The Rat Patrol, Hogan's Heroes and Alias Smith and Jones. Longet was cast as Sharhri Javid in the 1965 episode "The Silent Dissuaders" of the NBC education drama series, Mr. Novak, starring James Franciscus.

She appeared many times on The Andy Williams Show series and specials. She occasionally appeared as a singer on other variety and music programs, including those of singers Bobby Darin and Tom Jones. Williams described Longet as "a beautiful, athletic, slender, petite brunette with large doe eyes--my favorite French singer."

Her career breakthrough occurred in 1966. She guest starred in the season-one finale of the series Run for Your Life starring Ben Gazzara. In the episode "The Sadness of a Happy Time", she performed her English-French bilingual rendition of Antônio Carlos Jobim's bossa nova song "Meditation" ("Meditação"). The episode was broadcast on 16 May 1966.

A&M Records cofounder Herb Alpert was among the viewers whom Longet charmed with her performance of "Meditation". When Alpert met Longet at a club in New Orleans in 1966, he offered her a recording contract with his company. Longet recorded singles, and five albums, for A&M Records between 1966 and 1970.

"Meditation" was Longet's first single release for A&M. Other Jobim compositions that she has recorded include "A Felicidade," "How Insensitive" ("Insensatez"), and "Dindi".

In 1968, Longet costarred with Peter Sellers in The Party, a box-office hit that Blake Edwards wrote, produced, and directed. Longet sang "Nothing to Lose" (music by Henry Mancini and lyrics by Don Black) in the film.

In 1971, she joined Williams's Barnaby Records label. She released singles and two albums for Barnaby: We've Only Just Begun in 1971 and Let's Spend the Night Together in 1972. She also recorded songs for a projected third album for Barnaby that went unreleased. Many of the songs for the planned third album appeared on the 1993 CD titled Sugar Me, after the Lynsey de Paul song that Longet recorded in the early 1970s, but the masters for some of the other songs are missing and presumed lost.

In 1975, she appeared as The Flower (a non-singing role) on the children's album The Little Prince, based on the novel by Antoine de Saint Exupéry. The album won the Grammy Award for Best Album for Children in 1976.

She has enjoyed success on the music popularity charts. Her 1967 debut album, Claudine, peaked at #11 on the Billboard pop albums chart in the US. Claudine became a RIAA-certified gold album, selling more than 500,000 copies. Subsequent albums The Look of Love peaked at #33 in 1967 and Love Is Blue peaked at #29 in 1968 on the Billboard pop albums chart in the U.S.

Longet's musical cohort on her charting albums was arranger Nick DeCaro. He also arranged her other two albums on A&M, Colours (1968) and Run Wild, Run Free (1970), as well as We've Only Just Begun on Barnaby.

She had hit singles in America on the Billboard Adult Contemporary chart. Her charting singles include her version of "Here, There and Everywhere" (music and lyrics by John Lennon and Paul McCartney), "Hello, Hello" (composed by Terry MacNeil and Peter Kraemer), "Good Day Sunshine" (composed by Lennon and McCartney), "Small Talk" (music and lyrics by Garry Bonner and Alan Gordon), and "Love is Blue", a 1967 Eurovision Song Contest entry that gained fourth place (music by André Popp and French lyrics by Pierre Cour [Pierre Lemaire]). Another song, "Wanderlove" (music and lyrics by Mason Williams), went to #7 on the singles charts in Singapore. She remains popular in Japan, where all of her original albums were reissued on CD.

Marriage to Andy Williams

Longet and Williams met in Las Vegas in 1960 while she was dancing lead in the Folies Bergère revue at the Tropicana Resort & Casino. Longet was having trouble with her car and had pulled to the side of the road. Driving by, Williams stopped to offer assistance. She was 18 and he was 32. They married on 15 December 1961 in Los Angeles and had three children: Noëlle (born on 24 September 1963), Christian (born on 15 April 1965), and Robert ("Bobby") (born on 1 August 1969). They legally separated in 1970 and divorced in January 1975. According to Williams, they remained "very good friends."

Friendship with Robert F. and Ethel Kennedy

Longet and Andy Williams were close friends of Senator Robert F. Kennedy and his wife, Ethel Kennedy. During the mid 1960s, the couple hosted the Kennedys at their residences in Bel Air, California, and Palm Springs, California, and spent time at the Kennedy residences at Hickory Hill and New York City. They took summer cruises together on the Salmon River in central Idaho and on the Colorado River.

On or before 4 June 1968, the day of the 1968 Democratic Party presidential primary in California, Kennedy—a contending Democratic presidential candidate—and his wife made tentative arrangements with Williams and Longet to visit Los Angeles's The Factory nightclub. According to Williams, Robert Kennedy told them that he would make a hand signal at the conclusion of his televised speech at the Ambassador Hotel to confirm their get-together.

Shortly after midnight on 5 June, Longet and Williams were watching Senator Kennedy's televised primary victory speech in Kennedy's suite at The Ambassador. When Williams rushed down to the hotel ballroom, he heard loud noises in the hallway and learned that Kennedy had been shot. Longet and Williams eventually joined Kennedy's family and friends at Good Samaritan Hospital where doctors labored to save the senator's life. They stayed at the hospital 24 hours. After Kennedy died during the early morning hours of 6 June, Longet and Williams went into his hospital room and saw Ethel Kennedy asleep near the body of her late husband.

Longet and Williams attended Kennedy's funeral at St. Patrick's Cathedral in New York City on 8 June. A television camera captured Williams consoling a sobbing Longet during the mass. After Kennedy's brother Edward M. "Ted" Kennedy delivered a brief and emotional eulogy, Williams and a choir sang "The Battle Hymn of the Republic". After the funeral mass, Longet and Williams accompanied Ethel Kennedy, Ted Kennedy, and other Kennedy family members on the 21-car funeral train that took Senator Kennedy's body to Washington, D.C., and Arlington National Cemetery for burial. The front page of the 9 June 1968 edition of the Washington Post featured a large photograph of Ted Kennedy and Longet standing together on the rear platform as the train passed through North Philadelphia.

Longet and Williams named their son Robert (born in August 1969) after Robert F. Kennedy.

Arrest and trial
Longet was arrested and charged with fatally shooting her boyfriend, Olympic skier Vladimir "Spider" Sabich, at his home in Aspen, Colorado, on 21 March 1976. At her trial, Longet said the gun discharged accidentally as Sabich was showing her how it worked. Williams publicly supported Longet throughout the trial, paid for her legal defense team, and escorted her to and from the courthouse. Asked later about his unwavering support of his ex-wife, Williams said, "She is the mother of my children and we never stopped being friends. We just didn't want to be married anymore."

The Pitkin County Sheriff's Office and 9th Colorado Judicial district's investigative office made two procedural errors that aided Longet's defense: They took a blood sample from her without first obtaining a warrant, and they confiscated her diary without a warrant. According to prosecutors, the sample showed the presence of cocaine in her blood, and her diary reportedly contradicted her claim that her relationship with Sabich had not soured. To further muddle the prosecution's case, the gun was mishandled by weapons non-experts. As they were unable to cite any of the disallowed material, prosecutors used the autopsy report to suggest that when Sabich was shot he was bent over, facing away, and at least 1.80 m (6 ft) from Longet, which would be inconsistent with the position and relative distance of someone who is demonstrating the operation of a firearm.

The jury convicted her of negligent homicide and sentenced her to pay a small fine and spend 30 days in jail. The judge allowed Longet to choose the days to be served, believing this arrangement would allow her to spend time with her children. She chose to serve most of her sentence on weekends. Critical reaction to the verdict and sentencing was exacerbated when she subsequently vacationed with her defense attorney, Ronald D. Austin, who was married at the time. Longet and Austin later married and still live in Aspen.

After the criminal trial, the Sabich family initiated civil proceedings to sue Longet. The case eventually was resolved out of court, with the provision that Longet never discuss or write about the killing or the settlement.

Marriages
Ron Austin (1 June 1985–present)
Andy Williams (1961–1975) (divorced), three children — daughter Noëlle Williams and sons Christian Williams and Bobby Williams. As an adult, Christian Williams moved to Costa Rica and started a teak tree farm. He died in Costa Rica on 23 July 2019.

Discography

US albums

Notable foreign albums

Charting singles

Filmography

1964: season 3, episode 5, "Silver Service" of Combat! as Claudette
1965: Twelve O'Clock High, season 2 episode 1, "The Loneliest Place in the World," as Suzanne
1966: Twelve O'Clock High, season 2, episode 18, "Underground," as Liane Golet
1966: season 1, episode 15, "The last harbor raid" of The Rat Patrol as Marianne (one of three episodes that were also shown as a film, Massacre Harbor)
1966: Hogan's Heroes, "It Takes A Thief... Sometimes", season 1, episode 20 as Michelle
1968: The Party, film, as Michele Monet
1970: Love American Style, "Love and the Minister", season 1, episode 24 as Susan
1971: How to Steal an Airplane (NBC TV movie), as Michelle Chivot
1973: Streets of San Francisco, season 1, episode 16, "The Set-Up" as Michelle Carl

Popular culture references

In music
In 1980, Mick Jagger and Keith Richards wrote a song about Spider Sabich's death that was intended to be on the Rolling Stones album Emotional Rescue. The song, titled "Claudine," carried lyrics that painted a graphic picture of some of the more salacious aspects of the affair and killing. It was deemed too controversial and was removed, although it was included on several bootleg Rolling Stones albums. In November 2011, the track "Claudine" was released on the deluxe reissue of their album Some Girls.
The Geraldine Fibbers recorded a song called Claudine on their 1997 album Butch. Although an instrumental, the credits show vocals courtesy of Spider Sabich Memorial Choir.

In television

1976: season 1, episode 18 of Saturday Night Live featured a Weekend Update segment about "The Claudine Longet Invitational Ski Championship." It showed skiers making runs down the slopes until they are "accidentally" shot by Claudine Longet, resulting in abrupt wipeouts. Longet's attorneys wrote a cease-and-desist letter to Lorne Michaels and an apology was given in the next week's show.
2003: City Confidential episode 4.13, "Aspen: Murder on the Slopes" (29 July 2003), featured the city of Aspen and the case.
Gilmore Girls:
Season 1, episode 12 (18 January 2001) of the show features a song by Longet, her version of "God Only Knows" (composed by Brian Wilson and Tony Asher). Lorelai Gilmore comments regarding Longet, "The chick who shot the skiier?...Wow. Renaissance woman."
Season 5, episode 22 (15 May 2005 season finale) of the show features Longet's recording of "I Think It's Going to Rain Today" (composed by Randy Newman, who played piano at the session).
The Politician:
Season 1, episode 7 (27 September 2019) of the Netflix show The Politician features Longet's recording of "Love Is Blue".

In art
2012: Artist Josh Agle created a piece titled "Love, Spider" for the Denver Modernism Show depicting a Colorado scene with a brunette in the foreground wearing a cast signed with a heart by someone named Spider.

References

External links
 
 
 
 Cuddle Up with Claudine fansite
 Blog featuring Longet ephemera

1942 births
Living people
A&M Records artists
American television actresses
American women pop singers
French-language singers of the United States
French emigrants to the United States
French television actresses
Actresses from Paris
Traditional pop music singers
20th-century American actresses
20th-century French actresses
20th-century French women singers
Longet, Claudine
20th-century American women singers
20th-century American singers
20th-century American criminals
Prisoners and detainees of Colorado
21st-century American women